Lakeland Community College is a public community college in Lake County, Ohio. Established in 1967, Lakeland was the first college in Ohio founded by a vote of the people. Today, Lakeland serves more than 8,000 full-time and part-time students each year at the main campus in Kirtland, an off-site location in Madison, and via distance learning.

History

In 1964, area residents met to consider establishing a community college in Lake County. After the group had gathered enough evidence to justify its establishment, the local League of Women Voters petitioned successfully to place the issue on a countywide ballot, and it passed in 1965; the passage of the related levy passed in 1967. Classes began later that year in various locations in Painesville; the college purchased land for its current permanent location in Kirtland in 1968, with classes commencing there in 1971.

In 1968, 400 acres of land the community college is built upon, including Mooreland Mansion, was purchased by the Lakeland Community College Board of Trustees.

The college expanded in ensuing years, including the construction of the engineering building in 1983, the business building in 1988, the Student Center in 1993, and the Health Technologies Building in 1995; the renovation and expansion of the library in 1997; the renovation of the Athletic and Fitness Center in 2000; the construction of the Holden University Center in 2011; and the addition of extension campuses in the Lake County locations of Madison in 1994 and Willowick in 1997. The Health Technologies Building was expanded further in the 2010s, reopening in 2018.

Lakeland's mailing address was Mentor from 1971 to 1994. (About a quarter of Lakeland's property extends into Mentor.)

Lakeland was the site of training camp for the Cleveland Browns from 1982 to 1991.

Academics
Lakeland is accredited by the Higher Learning Commission. The college offers more than 130 associate degrees and certificates that prepare students for employment or transfer to a four-year college or university. Areas of study include arts and humanities, business technologies, engineering technologies, science and health technologies, and social science and public service. The college also offers non-credit community learning and professional development classes and workforce development training. Mooreland Mansion, officially Edward W. and Louise C. Moore Estate as listed on the National Register of Historic Places, built in 1898, expanded in 1906, and renovated in 1998, is located on the campus, and is used as a community facility.

Lakeland offers credit and noncredit courses at one off-site center located in Madison, Ohio. Classes offered at the off-site center are the same as those in the regular Lakeland curriculum and are taught by the same pool of full-time and part-time faculty. Community learning courses are also offered, providing residents of the service area an opportunity to access noncredit, non-grade-based learning experiences. Courses are offered during the fall and spring semesters with limited offerings in the summer. Courses are conducted throughout the day, evening, and Saturday mornings.

Athletics

Lakeland Community College offers seven varsity athletic teams. Women's sports include basketball, softball, and volleyball.  Men's sports include baseball, basketball, and soccer. Lakeland CC participates in Region XII of the NJCAA and are members of the Ohio Community College Athletic Conference (OCCAC).

The Lakeland Lakers have long been represented by a line drawing of a wave and a simple "L" on uniform caps. In 2019, a new logo and mascot named "Crash" were selected by the college.

See also
List of colleges and universities in Ohio
List of community colleges

References

Further reading

External links
Official website

 
Educational institutions established in 1967
Education in Lake County, Ohio
Community colleges in Ohio
Buildings and structures in Lake County, Ohio
Kirtland, Ohio
NJCAA athletics
1967 establishments in Ohio